Magnolia Award for Best Supporting Actress is awarded under the Shanghai Television Festival.

Winners and nominees

2020s

2010s

References

Shanghai Television Festival
Television awards for Best Supporting Actress